Lihuel Calel is a department of the province of La Pampa (Argentina).

References

External links

Departments of La Pampa Province